Kaliua District is one of the seven districts of the Tabora Region of Tanzania. It is bordered to the north by Kahama and Ushetu Districts, to the east by Uyui District and Urambo District, to the south by Katavi Region and to the west by Uvinza District and Geita Region. Its administrative seat is the town of Kaliua.

In 2016 the Tanzania National Bureau of Statistics report there were 442,182 people in the ward, from 393,358 in 2012.

Transport
Halfpaved Trunk road T18 from Tabora to Kigoma passes through the district.

The Tanzanian Central Line train - from Dar es Salaam to Kigoma - passes through the district. The train track to Mpanda branches off from the main line in Kaliua town.

Administrative subdivisions
As of 2012, Kaliua District was administratively divided into 21 wards.

Wards

 Ichemba
 Igagala
 Igombe Mkulu
 Igwisi
 Kaliua
 Kamsekwa
 Kanindo
 Kanoge
 Kashishi
 Kazaroho
 Milambo
 Mwongozo
 Sasu
 Seleli
 Silambo
 Ugunga
 Ukumbisiganga
 Ushokola
 Usinge
 Uyowa
 Zugimlole

References

Districts of Tabora Region